Hypsilurus godeffroyi, the northern forest dragon or Palau tree dragon, is a species of agama found in Palau and Papua New Guinea.

References

Hypsilurus
Taxa named by Wilhelm Peters
Reptiles described in 1867
Agamid lizards of New Guinea
Reptiles of Palau